Cotonou Cadjehoun Airport  is an airport in the Cadjehoun neighborhood of Cotonou, the largest city in Benin, in West Africa. The airport is the largest in the country, and as such, is the primary entry point into the country by air, with flights to Africa and Europe.

The airport is named after cardinal Bernardin Gantin.

Airlines and destinations

Passenger

Cargo

Statistics

Accidents and incidents
 UTA Flight 141: On 25 December 2003, the airplane crashed in the Bight of Benin, killing 151 of the 163 occupants, most of them Lebanese.

Replacement
In 1974, it was decided to move the operations of the Cotonou international airport to a new facility in Glo-Djigbé. Lack of funding quickly stopped the project.

Plans were revived in 2011 and President Yayi Boni presided at a ceremonial start to the construction of the new airport, using South African funding. Construction on the new facility appears to have stalled again.

Meanwhile, improvements to the Cotonou airport were initiated.

References

External links 
 Cotonou airport – Cotonou airport website
 OurAirports – Cotonou

Airports in Benin
Buildings and structures in Cotonou